The Cypriot football club AEK Larnaca FC has taken part in various European competitions over the years, notably taking part in the UEFA Cup Winners' Cup in 1996–97, and reaching the group stage in the UEFA Europa League in 2011–12.

All time statistics

Including 2011–12 season

Opponents

Including 2011–12 season

Competitions

UEFA Cup Winners' Cup / European Cup Winners' Cup

UEFA Europa League / UEFA Cup

Including 2018–19 season

Europe
Cypriot football clubs in international competitions